Gift of Bread is an Australian food rescue charitable organisation based in Sydney. Volunteers collect leftover bread products from bakeries. It is then sliced and packaged, and distributed to those who need it.

According to Australian food rescue pioneer OzHarvest, "Bread is the cheapest commodity, it's so easy to keep churning out. For bakeries, if they want to make their shelves look full they have to keep making it".

History 

Gift of Bread began in 2007 when one person collected and distributed the leftover bread each Friday from a local Bakers Delight store. As more volunteers and bakeries joined the program, it grew significantly. By 2018, Gift of Bread was processing and delivering 290,000 bags of bread per year.

In 2016, in recognition of the importance of the project, Canterbury League Club donated a Toyota HiAce van to Gift of Bread. This meant there was less reliance on volunteer's vehicles, and bread could be collected and distributed more quickly and efficiently.

Community leader Dr George Peponis noted that “bread may seem like a simple item but it is a staple in many diets; every culture has some form of bread in their cuisine so not only is it nourishing, it is also unifying in the fact that everyone has a basic right to a standard of living adequate for their health and well-being”.

In May 2017, The Daily Telegraph featured Gift of Bread in its coverage of National Volunteer Week. In August 2017, the Member for Summer Hill, Jo Haylen paid tribute to Gift of Bread in the New South Wales Legislative Assembly.

In May 2018, Gift of Bread obtained a second bread collection and delivery van, "Spirit of Faith", following donations from the NSW Government, Inner West Council and Amato's Liquor Mart.

In 2020, Gift of Bread founder Marcel De Maria was awarded the title of Westfield Local Hero, which included a grant of $10 000 to Gift of Bread.

Business process 
At the end of the day, volunteers collect surplus bread and bakery products from retail bakeries across the Inner West of Sydney. Products are then transported to a processing and distribution centre. The main centre is located in Tempe, New South Wales, with more than ten other distribution centres and minor hubs.

Bread loaves are sliced and packed, and rolls and bakery products are packaged uniformly. The resulting packages are provided free of charge to charitable organisations, boarding houses, nursing homes, community groups, schools, churches, outreach programs and individuals.

Major beneficiaries of Gift of Bread include the Exodus Foundation, Australian Red Cross, Society of Saint Vincent de Paul and Youth Off The Streets.

Operating costs are funded by donations, sausage sizzles and an annual dinner.

See also
 List of food banks

References

Further reading

External links 

2007 establishments in Australia
Food banks in Australia
Organizations established in 2007
Social welfare charities
Non-profit organisations based in New South Wales
Christian relief organizations